Starz is a Canadian English language premium television network owned by Bell Media.

The channel launched in 1994 as TMN Moviepix, a sister service to The Movie Network (now the Crave pay TV network) carrying classic films; it carried this format under various names including Mpix and The Movie Network Encore. Under its current name and format launched in March 2019, the network also broadcasts select original programming from the U.S.-based Starz premium channel, pursuant to a partnership between Bell Media and Starz Inc. parent company Lionsgate announced in early 2018.

Starz is carried by various Canadian cable and satellite television providers, including Bell Satellite TV, Shaw Direct, Rogers Cable, Vidéotron, EastLink, Shaw, Telus and Cogeco; since the 2019 relaunch it has also been available on a direct-to-consumer basis as an addon to the Crave streaming service, as well as through Amazon Prime Video Channels and Apple TV Channels. Similarly to TMN/Crave, TMN Encore operated only in provinces east of the Ontario-Manitoba border until 2016, with Western Canada served by a similar service run by Movie Central known as Encore Avenue. With the shutdown of both services in 2016, Encore/Starz has since served the entirety of Canada.

History
The channel was launched on October 1, 1994 as TMN Moviepix; by 1996, its name was shortened to simply Moviepix. By 2001, the channel's name was shortened for the third time to simply Mpix. The channel was originally owned by Astral Communications (later Astral Media).

In an effort to re-align Mpix with The Movie Network brand, on August 20, 2012, Astral announced that it would be rebranding Mpix as The Movie Network Encore, or TMN Encore, on September 18, 2012. On the day of the rebrand, its multiplex channel MorePix was accordingly renamed TMN Encore 2; with the change, TMN Encore 2 also launched a high definition feed, which simulcasts its standard definition counterpart.

TMN Encore was also the only private broadcaster financing film preservation in Canada through its sponsorship of the Audio-Visual Preservation Trust of Canada (now defunct), and National Archives.

On March 4, 2013, the Competition Bureau approved the takeover of Astral Media by Bell Media. Bell filed a new application for the proposed takeover with the CRTC on March 6, 2013; the CRTC approved the merger on June 27, 2013.

On November 19, 2015, Corus Entertainment announced that as a result of a strategic review, it had decided to exit the pay-television industry. The company announced that it would shut down Encore Avenue and Movie Central (which held a monopoly position in Western Canada, while TMN held a monopoly in the East), and work with Bell to transition existing subscribers to TMN Encore and The Movie Network respectively. The CRTC had quietly removed the regional restrictions from both services' licences earlier in the year.

On January 23, 2018, Bell Media announced that it had reached licensing agreements with Starz Inc. and Lionsgate, and that TMN Encore would be rebranded under the Starz brand in 2019, featuring its programming. Following TMN's rebranding as Crave in November 2018, the channel rebranded as just Encore (coincidentally, the original name of Starz's sister network, Starz Encore), keeping the same logo, as an interim name until the rebrand to Starz took place.

On February 7, 2019, Bell announced that Encore would be rebranded as Starz, which was effective March 1. Shortly thereafter, Starz also became available on a direct-to-consumer basis as an add-on to the Crave streaming service, being priced at $5.99 per month.

Distribution
Starz operates as a separate service from Bell Media's other premium TV service Crave (formerly The Movie Network) and under a separate licence, though they shared consistent branding until November 2018. Subscribers to one of the two services through a traditional TV service provider do not necessarily have to subscribe to the other; however, Crave (as TMN) was very frequently sold together in a package with Encore, and some providers continue to offer Crave and Starz only as part of a combined package.

The service is also available on a direct-to-consumer basis (currently for $5.99 per month) through the following methods:
 through the Crave OTT streaming platform (requires a subscription to the base Crave service);
 through Amazon's Prime Video Channels marketplace (requires a subscription to Amazon Prime); and
 through Apple TV Channels (only supported through the Apple TV app, which is available on Apple products and some non-Apple devices, but does not require a subscription to another service such as Apple TV+).

Channels

List of channels
On most service providers, Starz provides two 24-hour multiplex channels, both of which are simulcast in both standard definition and high definition – as well as a subscription video-on-demand service (Starz on Demand).

Starz broadcasts its primary and multiplex channels on both Eastern Time Zone and Mountain Time Zone schedules, for viewers east or west of the Ontario-Manitoba border respectively. Viewers of the linear Starz channels via over-the-top streaming platforms can only access the Eastern Time feeds.

Background
For a time, Mpix was focused on classic thriller, suspense and action films, while MorePix focused on classic dramas and light-hearted movies. This distinction no longer seems to be in place and both channels now carry a variety of films from various genres and eras, though Starz 2 is more likely to carry older and/or less commercially successful films.

Related services

High-definition simulcasts
The high definition simulcast feeds of the Starz channels broadcast in the 1080i resolution format.

Mpix / Encore originally had only one HD simulcast channel, first known as MHD, which launched in January 2006 and alternated between simulcasts of Mpix and its multiplex channel MorePix. In September 2010, this feed began simulcasting the primary channel exclusively. A high definition simulcast of TMN Encore 2 was launched on September 23, 2012.

Starz on Demand
Starz operates a subscription video-on-demand television service called Starz on Demand, which is available at no additional charge to new and existing subscribers of Starz. The service, which launched on December 19, 2006, as Mpix on Demand, and later as TMN Encore on Demand, carries feature film content from the two linear Starz television channels. Initially, it featured a rotating program selection that incorporated select new titles that were added each Friday, alongside existing program titles held over from the previous one to two weeks; most programs are now available for a much longer period depending on Starz' term of licence for each program.

TMN Encore GO
On February 27, 2013, The Movie Network Encore launched TMN Encore GO as a section of TMN GO, TMN's website and mobile app for the iPad, iPhone and iPod Touch, which carries feature film content available for streaming in standard or high definition. TMN Encore GO was initially available to TMN Encore subscribers of Bell Satellite TV, Bell Fibe TV, Cogeco Cable and Rogers Cable.

TMN GO (including TMN Encore GO) was discontinued on November 1, 2018 in connection with the relocation of TMN programming to Crave. Encore's classic film library was not immediately migrated to Crave or its apps, but remained available through service provider-specific video-on-demand websites/apps where it was already available; some recent Starz programming had already been added to Crave's base service as a "limited-time offering". With Encore's relaunch as Starz, all of the service's programming will be accessible on-demand via the Crave platform; most of the Starz content already available as part of Crave's base level will remain there, but any new seasons or other Starz series going forward will require a subscription to the Starz addon.

Programming
The majority of the program content offered by the Starz channels is in the form of classic films. For a time while under the Mpix and TMN Encore names, the channel offered a limited amount of television series in the form of pop culture-related series on the topic of films and filmmaking including:
 Moviehead, a show that takes a snapshot look at a movie and how it was made; hosted by Matt Hawkins aired every Friday before the 9 p.m. Reel Premiere (a weekly debut of a new movie to the service).
 Movie Style, a lifestyle show on TMN Encore 2, hosted by Lisa Williams and Matt Hawkins, that combines films with trends in fashion, design, beauty and entertainment.

Following the January 2018 announcement of Bell's partnership with Starz, Encore began airing selected original programming from that service in advance of a full relaunch scheduled for March 2019. Subsequent to the full relaunch, the service also began carrying other library series that were produced for other channels by Lionsgate, including the Showtime-commissioned series Nurse Jackie and Weeds.

Similar to Crave's output deals with HBO and Showtime, the Bell/Starz partnership covers new and most library series produced and fully owned by Starz and Lionsgate. The Canadian Starz channel has also reclaimed the season premiere rights to some pre-existing series such as Power, past seasons of which first aired on Super Channel, Starz' previous Canadian partner. However, Super Channel retained the premiere rights to The Spanish Princess (a sequel to The White Queen and The White Princess, both of which have since repeated on Starz in Canada). Certain other series commissioned by Starz but distributed internationally by other companies, such as Outlander (produced by Sony and carried in Canada by W Network and Netflix) and American Gods (for which Amazon Video holds worldwide rights outside the U.S.), were not affected at all by this change.

From time to time, Starz has also acquired Canadian rights to series not produced by Lionsgate or commissioned by Starz (U.S.), such as the Hulu-commissioned series The Act, High Fidelity, and Ramy.

Movie library
From December 1994 to February 2019, the channel primarily aired a rotation of classic films from Columbia Pictures, 20th Century Fox, Warner Bros., Universal Pictures, and Paramount Pictures, and their sister companies.

Since the channel was relaunched as Starz, the channel continues to air classic films from the aforementioned studios, though the majority of the channel's film library now comes from the catalogue of Starz parent company Lionsgate and its sister company Summit Entertainment. Beginning in 2020, the channel also began carrying first-run movies from Lionsgate which were released theatrically from late 2019 onwards, starting with the release of Bombshell.

See also
 Crave (TV network) – formerly The Movie Network
 Crave (streaming service) – formerly CraveTV

References

External links
 
 Starz USA

English-language television stations in Canada
Bell Media networks
Movie channels in Canada
Television channels and stations established in 1994
Commercial-free television networks
1994 establishments in Canada